The 1995 All-Ireland Senior Camogie Championship—known as the Bórd na Gaeilge All-Ireland Senior Camogie Championship for sponsorship reasons—was the high point of the 1995 season. The championship was won by Cork who defeated Killkenny by a four-point margin in the final, taking the lead for only the first time in the match with a goal by Linda Mellerick that dropped into the net from a long shot with just 30 seconds of normal time left. The match drew an attendance of 9,874, then the highest for a camogie-only final (one which was not on a jint hurling programme), beating the 52-year-old attendance record set for Dublin v Cork in 1943. Lynn Dunlea scored 4-20 in the championship.

Sponsors
Bord na Gaeilge became the first sponsor of an All-Ireland camogie championship. At the launch Micheál Ó Muircheartaigh, Cathaoirleach of Bord na Gaeilge, said that “in sponsoring the camogie championship, Bord na Gaeilge is underlining the importance of promoting Irish at community level.”

Semi-finals
A powerful finishing 15 minutes saw Cork beat Wexford in the All-Ireland semi-final at Páirc Uí Rinn in a match in which a match in which Lyn Dunlea scored 3-9.while Kilkenny trailed Galway by 1-6 to 0-6 at half-time in the semi-final at Nowlan Park before Sinéad Millea’s free-taking yielded eleven points and Sinéad ran through the Galway defence to place Jillian Dillon for the all-important goal to give Kilkenny a 1-14 to 1-9 victory.

Final
Angela Downey brought her three-year-old daughter Katie in the pre-match parade for the final, a free ridden stop-start affair. She was marked by Paula Goggins in the final. Lynn Dunlea palmed a Cork goal, Angela Downey’s shot from a free cancelled it out. Cork sent on 17-year-old Vivienne Harris (a niece of international soccer player Miah Dennehy) as a sub and she made an immediate impact. Angela Downey scored another goal from another 15-metre free. Cork captain, Denise Cronin, finished a spectacular solo run through the Kilkenny defence with a goal. Kilkenny were leading by a point when Linda Mellerick gathered a short clearance and landed a speculative ball in the goal giving Cork the lead for the first time. A third close-in free by Angela Downey was defended and Cork won by four points. Kathryn Davis wrote in the Irish Times:
Putting ghosts to rest is a regular pastime at Corke Park and another was laid to rest yesterday when Cork defeated Killkenny for the first time in six final meetings over the past 20 years . A goal by Linda Mellerick with only 30 seconds of normal time remaining saw Cork take the trophy for the 17th time. 
Linda Mellerick said:
I knew we were a point down so when I caught the ball I kept going and just hit it. I was not certain whether I had scored as they were a bit slow in putting up the flag, but the crowd was cheering and then I realised that it was a goal. Words cannot describe what it is like beating Kilkenny in a final. With ten minutes to go we were dead and buried and God must have had a hand in it.

Dunleas
Sisters Lynn and Stephanie Dunlea were grand-nieces of Kate Dunlea who captained Cork to their first All-Ireland success in 1934.

Final stages

References

External links
 Historical reports of All Ireland finals

1995 in camogie
1995